Barbara Park, an American author, wrote and published dozens of books for children. Her Junie B. Jones series encompasses 31 books and had collectively sold 55 million copies worldwide as of 2013, according to Park's publisher, Random House. The series started in 1992, with the publication of Junie B. Jones and the Stupid Smelly Bus. The New York Times described Junie B. Jones, the main character of the series, as "a 6-year-old dispenser of abundant opinions, Runyonesque wisecracks and dubious syntax." When the series began, Junie B. was just entering kindergarten and remained there until Junie B., First Grader (at Last!), the 18th book in the series, was published in 2001.

Park also wrote other books for young readers, including Skinnybones, published in 1982, and The Graduation of Jake Moon, published in 2002.

Junie B. Jones
 Junie B. Jones and the Stupid Smelly Bus  Junie B. Jones is On Her Way! (#1) (1992) Junie B. Jones describes her feelings about starting kindergarten and what she does when she decides not to ride the bus home.
 Junie B. Jones and a Little Monkey Business (#2) (1993) Through a misunderstanding, Junie B. thinks that her new baby brother is really a baby monkey, and her report of this news creates excitement and trouble in her kindergarten class.
 Junie B. Jones and Her Big Fat Mouth (#3) (1993) When her kindergarten class has Job Day, Junie B. goes through much confusion and excitement before deciding on the "bestest" job of all.
 Junie B. Jones and Some Sneaky Peeky Spying (#4) (1994) Junie B.'s penchant for spying on people and her curiosity about the private life of her teacher,  whom she simply calls Mrs., gets her in trouble at school and at home.
 Junie B. Jones and the Yucky Blucky Fruitcake (#5) (1995) Junie B. looks forward to winning lots of prizes at the school carnival, but a fruitcake and a comb were not exactly what she had in mind.
 Junie B. Jones and That Meanie Jim's Birthday (#6) (1996) Junie B. is very upset when Jim, a boy who bullies her in class, plans to invite everyone except her to his birthday party.
 Junie B. Jones Loves Handsome Warren (#7) (1996) Unable to compete with her friends' fancy clothes and running abilities, Junie B. finds her own way to make the new boy at school like her.
 Junie B. Jones Has a Monster Under Her Bed (#8) (1997) During Picture Day when Junie B. is told by another student that a monster lurks under her bed, rekindling her fear of monsters, she takes desperate actions to make it go away.
 Junie B. Jones Is Not a Crook (#9) (1997) Junie B. experiences glee while showing off her new furry mittens, but disaster strikes when they disappear from the playground, and she must find a way to get them back.
 Junie B. Jones Is a Party Animal (#10) (1997) Junie B.'s best friend, Lucille, invites Junie B. and another girl named Grace to spend the night at her Nana's mansion.
 Junie B. Jones Is a Beauty Shop Guy (#11) (1998) Junie B. believes she has a calling to become a beauty shop worker, and after practicing on various stuffed animals, she decides to move on to a human subject—herself.
 Junie B. Jones Smells Something Fishy (#12) (1998) Frustrated because the rules for her class's Pet Day will not let her take her dog to school, Junie B. considers taking a raccoon, a worm, a dead fish, and other unusual replacements instead.
 Junie B. Jones Is (Almost) a Flower Girl (#13) (1999) Junie B.'s Aunt Flo is having a wedding, and Junie B. is upset that she is not the flower girl.
 Junie B. Jones And The Mushy Gushy Valentime (#14) (1999) When Junie B. receives a special valentine on Valentine's Day, she tries to find out who in her class sent it.
 Junie B. Jones Has a Peep in Her Pocket (#15) (2000) When Junie B. learns that her kindergarten class is going on a field trip to a farm, she worries about being attacked by a rooster or pony after watching a horror show.
 Junie B. Jones Is Captain Field Day (#16) (2001) As the captain of Room Nine's field day team, Junie B. tries to rally her troops after they lose several events.
 Junie B. Jones Is a Graduation Girl (#17) (2001) Junie B. has just turned six and is looking forward to her kindergarten graduation, but when she accidentally stains the white graduation gown she could not resist trying on, she is afraid graduation is ruined.
 Junie B., First Grader (at last!) (#18) (2001) Junie B. becomes a first grader, but she finds out that she needs glasses.
 Junie B., First Grader: Boss of Lunch (#19) (2002) Junie B. helps out around the school cafeteria.
 Junie B., First Grader: Toothless Wonder (#20) (2002) Junie B. Jones learns about the Tooth Fairy when she becomes the first student in her first grade class to lose a front tooth.
 Junie B., First Grader: Cheater Pants (#21) (2003) Junie B. copies a fellow classmate's homework paper, which results in her teacher punishing her. When she later decides to copy off a test, she realizes cheating isn't worth it and owns up to it.
 Junie B., First Grader: One-Man Band (#22) (2003) Junie B. must perform in the halftime show at her school's kickball tournament all alone after her friend Sheldon deserts her.
 Junie B., First Grader: Shipwrecked (#23) (2004) Junie B. plays a ship in a school play about Christopher Columbus, but has to deal with other students’ illnesses and a girl named May hogging the stage.
 Junie B., First Grader: Boo...and I MEAN IT! (#24) (2004) With Halloween approaching, Junie B. needs to find a costume that will scare off the monsters she believes will be out on the holiday.
 Junie B., First Grader: Jingle Bells, Batman Smells (P.S. So Does May) (#25) (2005) Junie B. wishes that a girl named May would stop being such a tattletale, but when she is stuck as May's Secret Santa, she must decide between what she wants to do and what is right.
 Junie B., First Grader: Aloha-ha-ha! (#26) (2006) Junie B. manages to get into trouble every day during a trip to Hawaii and records each incident in a photo journal given to her by her teacher.
 Junie B., First Grader: Dumb Bunny! (#27) (2007) Junie B. is determined to win the grand prize at Lucille's Easter egg hunt.
 Junie B., First Grader: Turkeys We Have Loved and Eaten (and Other Thankful Stuff) (#28) (2013) To celebrate the Thanksgiving holiday, Mr. Scary's first grade class prepares a Thankful List for the school contest, but Junie B. finds it hard to be grateful for squash, pumpkin pie, or tattletale May.
 Top-Secret Personal Beeswax: A Journal by Junie B. (and Me!) (2003). A diary where Junie B. talks about her life, with activity pages for the reader to write in.
 Junie B's Essential Survival Guide to School (2009) Junie B. gives advice on how to survive school and explains what she would do if she were a teacher.
 Junie B.'s These Puzzles Hurt My Brain! Book  (2011) An activity book with puzzles.

Picture books 
 Psssst! It's Me...the Bogeyman
 Ma! There's Nothing to Do Here! A Word from Your Baby-in-Waiting

Other novels 
 Almost Starring Skinnybones
 Beanpole
 Buddies
 Dear God, Help!!! Love, Earl
 Don't Make Me Smile
 The Graduation of Jake Moon
 The Kid in the Red Jacket
 Maxie, Rosie, and Earl - Partners in Grime
 Mick Harte Was Here
 My Mother Got Married (And Other Disasters)
 Operation: Dump the Chump
 Rosie Swanson: Fourth-Grade Geek for President
 Skinnybones

References

Park, Barbara
Children's novels